Malmö City FC is a Swedish football club located in Malmö.

Background
Malmo City Football Club was formed for the 2009 season following the merger of the Kirseberg IF and Rörsjöstaden IF clubs. Kirseberg IF was founded in Kirseberg in Malmo in 1937 under the name BK Vargo.

Since their foundation Malmö City FC has participated in the middle divisions of the Swedish football league system.  The club currently plays in Division 3 Södra Götaland which is the fifth tier of Swedish football. They play their home matches at the Kirseberg IP in Malmö. This was previously the home venue of Kirseberg IF.

Malmö City FC are affiliated to the Skånes Fotbollförbund. In 2009 the club was running 20 teams with approximately 600 members.

Recent history
In recent seasons Malmö City FC have competed in the following divisions:

2014 – Division IV, Västra Skåne
2013 – Division IV, Västra Skåne
2012 – Division III, Södra Götaland
2011 – Division III, Södra Götaland
2010 – Division III, Södra Götaland
2009 – Division III, Södra Götaland

Attendances

In recent seasons Malmö City FC have had the following average attendances:

Footnotes

External links
 Malmö City FC – Official website
 Malmö City FC Facebook

Football clubs in Malmö
Football clubs in Skåne County
Association football clubs established in 2009
2009 establishments in Sweden